The Graniteville Historic District of Westford, Massachusetts, USA, encompasses one of the town's historic 19th century industrial villages. The area was, until the arrival of the railroad in 1847, primarily known for its granite quarries. The railroad's arrival prompted the construction of an industrial mill by Charles G. Sargent, and the area developed rapidly thereafter. A significant amount of housing stock, as well as civic institutional buildings, were built during the second half of the 19th century. The district is bounded on the east by River Street and on the south by Bridge Street and North Main Street. The western edge of the district runs just before North Main Street's junction with West Street, northward and then eastward to encompass a number of quarry sites, before meeting North Main Street at River Street.

The district was listed on the National Register of Historic Places in 2002.

See also
Forge Village Historic District
Brookside Historic District
National Register of Historic Places listings in Middlesex County, Massachusetts

References

Historic districts in Westford, Massachusetts
National Register of Historic Places in Middlesex County, Massachusetts
Historic districts on the National Register of Historic Places in Massachusetts